The Provincial Agricultural Fair of Canada West was an annual provincial agricultural fair held in various places in Canada West and after 1867 in Ontario.

The fair was established in 1846 and sponsored by the Provincial Agricultural Association and the Board of Agriculture for Canada West. It replaced an earlier attempt in 1792 by the  Agricultural Society of Upper Canada founded in Newark in 1792.

The fair was mainly an agricultural themed show featuring horses and domesticated animals from around what was still a very rural pre-Confederation Ontario. It would last until 1878 as it met competition with large number of local fairs that emerged across some towns and counties in Ontario and eventually succeeded by the Canadian National Exhibition in 1879.

List of Provincial Agricultural Association of Canada West/Ontario

From 1858 the fair rotated between Toronto, Kingston, Hamilton and London in the same sequence for the duration of the fair's existence.

Following Toronto's decision to create a permanent fair (Toronto Industrial Exhibition or now the Canadian National Exhibition), the provincial fair was replaced by the Dominion Exhibition from 1879 until 1913.

The remaining cities that continue with their existing fairs are:

 Kingston: continued with the Frontenac Agricultural Society Fair that began in 1825 on an irregular pattern to 1925, thereafter the Kingston Fair has been held annually
 Hamilton: the closest fair in the city has been the Ancaster Fall Fair held since 1850
 London: continued with the Western Fair that began in 1868 and operating since 1885 as the only fall fair in the city

Other fairs

A list of annual agricultural and/or country fairs in Ontario created before or after the establishment of the provincial fair:

Kingston Fall Fair - 1912–present, operated by the Kingston and District Agricultural Society. A revival of the previous Midland Fair which operated from 1830 until 1880.
 East Middlesex Agricultural Fair - 1841. Held annual fairs until 1868 at north-west corner of Talbot and Oxford - London, ON
 Markham Fair 1857–present, Markham, ON
 Brampton Fall Fair 1853–present, Brampton, ON
 Norfolk County Fair and Horse Show 1840–present, Simcoe, ON
 Schomberg Fair 1850–present, Schomberg, ON
 Western Fair 1868–present,  London, ON
 Scarboro Fair 1844 to early 20th Century - Scarborough, ON
 Williamstown Fall Fair 1812–present, Williamstown, ON is the oldest continuing fall fair in Ontario and replacing an unnamed fair that was held in town since 1808
 Royal Agricultural Winter Fair 1922–present, held in Toronto at Exhibition Place in the Colisium
The International Plowing Match held annually since 1913 in a different location in Ontario each year, has become the largest outdoor agricultural and rural fair in North America.

Other annual fairs around Canada and the United States:

 Hants County Exhibition c. 1765 and annual since 1815 - Windsor, NS
 Canadian Western Agribition 1971 - Regina, SK
 Royal Manitoba Winter Fair 1882 - Winnipeg, MB
 Pacific National Exhibition 1910 - Vancouver, BC
 Great New York State Fair 1841 - NY State
 Provincial Agricultural Fair of Lower Canada - created in 1847 with Montreal hosting fair in 1853 but since ended. Expo Richmond Fair is the only visible and annual fall fair remaining in Quebec (since 1856)

References

Agricultural fairs in Canada
Exhibitions in Canada
Recurring events established in 1846
Annual fairs
History of agriculture in Ontario